The Big Pets is a children's picture book by Lane Smith.  It was originally published in 1991 by Viking Books.

Plot
Lane Smith's pictures depict a dreamscape where gigantic pets frolic with their small young owners in a succession of fantasy environments.

Award
This book received a Golden Apple of Bratislava.

References

External links
Lane Smith's Website

1991 children's books
American children's books
American picture books
Books about cats